The Australian Tournament Players Championship was a golf tournament held in Australia between 1988 and 1999.

The events was held in 1988 and 1989 at Riverside Oaks Golf Club, Sydney with both events being won by Greg Norman. Total prize money was A$300,000 in 1988 and A$500,000 in 1989.

After a three-year gap the tournament was revived in 1993 as the Optus Players Championship. Prize money was A$300,000 in 1993, A$285,000 in 1994 and A$350,000 in 1995.

Tournament highlights

During the 1989 tournament, Robert Emond scored 19 on the 573-yard par five 1st hole during his second round, while Adam Nance scored 11 on the 152-yard par three 14th hole during his first round.

Winners

Notes

References

Former PGA Tour of Australasia events
Golf tournaments in Australia
Recurring sporting events established in 1988
Recurring sporting events disestablished in 1999
1988 establishments in Australia
1999 disestablishments in Australia